The People's Champ Movement (PCM) is a political party in the Philippines, currently affiliated with the PROMDI and previously the United Nationalist Alliance. It is led by Manny Pacquiao, who founded the party, and is mainly based in General Santos and Sarangani.

The party also ran for a seat in the congress in the 2019 elections, but they ranked 97 out of 134 running party-lists, thus not winning a seat. The votes they have are only 60,040, 0.22% of the national votes.

Members

The party has four elected officials:

 Elmer De Peralta - Vice-Governor of Sarangani
2016-Present
 Jinkee Pacquiao – Vice-Governor of Sarangani
2013–2016
 Steve Solon – Governor of Sarangani 2013–
Present and Vice-Governor 2007–2013
 Manny Pacquiao – Senator of the Philippines 
2016–Present and Leader of PCM

References

Conservative parties in the Philippines
Local political parties in the Philippines
Politics of South Cotabato
Politics of Sarangani
Political parties established in 2010
2010 establishments in the Philippines
Regionalist parties
Regionalist parties in the Philippines